Basiliolidae is a family of brachiopods belonging to the order Rhynchonellida.

Genera

Genera:
 Acanthobasiliola Zezina, 1981
 Aetheia Thomson, 1915
 Almorhynchia Ovtsharenko, 1983

References

Brachiopods